Jallowal  is a village in Kapurthala district of Punjab State, India. The village is administrated by a Sarpanch, who is an elected representative.( mostly Jatts).

Demography 
According to the report published by Census India in 2011, Jallowal has a total number of 85 houses and a population of 435 of which include 212 males and 223 females. Literacy rate of Jallowal is 68.60%, lower than the state average of 75.84%.  The population of children under the age of 6 years is 56 which is 12.87% of the total population of Jallowal, and the child sex ratio is approximately 806, lower than the state average of 846.

Population data

Air travel connectivity 
The closest airport to the village is Sri Guru Ram Dass Jee International Airport.

Villages in Kapurthala

References

External links
  Villages in Kapurthala
 Kapurthala Villages List

 Villages in Kapurthala district